Mark Peters (born 21 July 1975) is an English musician, songwriter and producer who has mainly created music for the band Engineers. He has also collaborated with the electronic musician Ulrich Schnauss on three albums; Underrated Silence, Tomorrow Is Another Day. and Destiny Waiving.

In December 2017, Peters released his debut solo album, Innerland, In April 2019, Peters released a reworked version of his solo debut album, titled New Routes out of Innerland.

Schnauss and Peters have also collaborated on a remix of the track "Falling in Swirls" by Helios, "Keep it Softcore" by Naked Lunch (UK band), "The Wind Was Playing with My Hair" by Rainbirds and also contributed score to the film Kaboom by Gregg Araki. The film also features "Clean Coloured Wire" from Three Fact Fader by Engineers.

Discography
with Engineers
Engineers (2005)
Three Fact Fader (2009)
In Praise of More (2010)
Always Returning (2014)
Pictobug (2020)

with Ulrich Schnauss
Underrated Silence (2012)
"Balcony Sunset"/"Sonnenaufgang 4:46 Uhr" - split single with Pyrolator (2012)
Tomorrow Is Another Day (2013)
"Remix of Rainbirds Wind Was Playing with My Hair"/"Im Nachtbus"/"Remix of Fehlfarben Herbstwind" - split single with Pyrolator (2014)
Destiny Waiving (2021)

with Elliot Ireland
Deep Blue (2015)
Deep Blue Remixes EP (2015)

with Salt Rush
Salt Rush with Mark Peters (2016)

with Clem Leek
"Thesis 19" (2020)

Solo
Innerland (2017)
"Silent Night" (2017)
"Jingle Bells" (2018)
New Routes out of Innerland (2019)
"Ambient Innerland" (2019)
"Box Of Delights" 7' (2019)
"Winterland (Mark Peters EP)" (2019)
Home KPM Shorts (2020)
Red Sunset Dreams (2022)
The Magic Hour e.p (2023)

Remixes
Sobrenadar - ‘Cruce’ (Mark Peters Remix) (Sonic Cathedral) (2018)
Umeko Ando - ‘Battaki’ (Mark Peters Remix) (Pingipung Records) (2018)
Imandra Lake - ‘Püünis’ (Mark Peters Remix) (Seksound) (2018)
Maps - ‘Surveil’ (Mark Peters Remix) (Mute) (2019)
MOLLY - ‘Coming of Age’ (Mark Peters Remix) (Sonic Cathedral) (2019)
''Elkyn - 'Yue' (2020)

References

External links
Official Bandcamp page
Official Soundcloud page
Mark Peters at discogs.com

1975 births
English songwriters
English male singers
English rock guitarists
English pop guitarists
English male guitarists
Musicians from Liverpool
Living people
21st-century English singers
21st-century British guitarists
21st-century British male singers
British male songwriters